Democratic Labour Party (PTD) is a Marxist-Leninist political party in Spain founded in 2013. The PTD is present in Madrid, Aragón, Asturias and Castilla-La Mancha.

History
The party was founded in 2013. The PTD has been critical with the traditional language and discourse employed by the majority of leninist organizations in Spain, supporting more flexible tactics and a political speech more "understandable" by the population. In 2014 the PTD absorbed two groups, Proletarian Union and a collective of ex-members of the Collectives of Communist Youth in Castilla-La Mancha. The PTD participated in the primaries of Podemos for the European elections, electing 1 candidate in the list (Virginia Muñoz, in the number 52).

In the local elections of 2015 the party participated in various coalitions, gaining a town councillor in Alcorcón in the list of Ganar Alcorcón.

External links
PTD web site (in Spanish)

References

2013 establishments in Spain
Communist parties in Spain
Far-left politics in Spain
Political parties established in 2013
Republican parties in Spain